The 2005–06 Slovak First Football League (known as the Slovak Corgoň Liga for sponsorship reasons) was the 13th season of first-tier football league in Slovakia, since its establishment in 1993. This season started on 16 July 2005 and ended on 31 May 2006. FC Artmedia Bratislava are the defending champions.

Format changes
The season was a last season where they competed 10 teams, because as the organization of Corgoň Liga decided that the league expanded to 12 teams into following season. Therefore, the three teams from the 2. Liga was promoted to Corgoň Liga.

Teams
A total of 10 teams was contested in the league, including 9 sides from the 2004–05 season and one promoted from the 2. Liga.

Relegation for FC Rimavská Sobota to the 2005–06 2. Liga was confirmed on 29 May 2005. The one relegated team were replaced by FC Nitra.

Stadiums and locations

League table

Results

First half of season

Second half of season

Season statistics

Top scorers

See also
2005–06 Slovak Cup
2005–06 2. Liga (Slovakia)

References

External links
RSSSF.org (Tables and statistics)

Slovak Super Liga seasons
Slovak
1